Winwick is a small village, a lost settlement and civil parish in West Northamptonshire in England. The modern settlement is north of West Haddon. A 16th-century brick manor house remains on the site. The population is included in the civil parish of West Haddon.

The village's name means 'specialised farm of Wina'. A few spellings show that it could maybe be 'specialised farm in a nook'. However, the name could come from the Old English 'wicincel' meaning 'small specialised farm'.

The Historic England website contains details of a total of 16 listed buildings in the parish of Winwick, all of which are Grade II with the exception of the following, which are Grade II*:
St Michael & All Angels' Church
Winwick Manor (south wing)
A gate arch to the south of the south front of the Manor House

References

External links 

Villages in Northamptonshire
Former populated places in Northamptonshire
Civil parishes in Northamptonshire
West Northamptonshire District